Thyretes hippotes is a moth in the family Erebidae. It was described by Pieter Cramer in 1780. It is found in South Africa.

The larvae feed on Pentzia incana.

References

Endemic moths of South Africa
Moths described in 1780
Syntomini